The Hotze House is a historic house at 1619 Louisiana Street in Little Rock, Arkansas.  It is a -story brick structure, with a combination of Georgian Revival and Beaux Arts styling.  Its main facade has an ornate half-round two-story portico sheltering the main entrance, with fluted Ionic columns and a modillioned cornice topped by a balustrade.  Windows are topped by cut stone lintels.  The hip roof is topped by a balustrade.  Built in 1900 to a design by Charles L. Thompson, its interior is claimed to have been designed by Louis Comfort Tiffany.  Peter Hotze, for whom it was built, was a major cotton dealer.

The house was listed on the National Register of Historic Places in 1975.

See also
First Hotze House, just around the corner
National Register of Historic Places listings in Little Rock, Arkansas

References

Houses on the National Register of Historic Places in Arkansas
Colonial Revival architecture in Arkansas
Beaux-Arts architecture in Arkansas
Houses completed in 1900
Houses in Little Rock, Arkansas
National Register of Historic Places in Little Rock, Arkansas
Historic district contributing properties in Arkansas